The Modern Serbo-Byzantine architectural style, Neo-Byzantine architectural style or Serbian national architectural style is the style in Serbian architecture which lasted from the second half of the 19th century to the first half of the 20th century. This style originated in the tradition of medieval Serbian-Byzantine school and was part of international Neo-Byzantine style.

History and characteristics

The beginning of the modern Serbian-Byzantine style lies in the romantic spirit, which was prevalent in Europe in the first half of the 19th century, and in the Serbian lands appeared by the mid-century and was alive to its last decades. The beginning of this style can be seen as "resistance" to newcomers' influences of the "western-style" (Classicism, Neo-Baroque) in the Principality of Serbia. The style is characterized by forms and decorations from the Serbian-Byzantine architectural heritage. This architectural approach is not strictly tied to the church architecture; in fact, the style was prosperous in secular architecture. It is also closely linked to the influence of Art Nouveau.

The Modern Serbo-Byzantine architectural style consists of three periods: the first or early period represents a combination of "western-style" with elements of Byzantine architecture. A typical example is the Church of St. George in Smederevo, where the longitudinal basis (characteristic of the West) appears five domes in the form of so-called. "Greek cross". The second period is related to the expansion and strengthening of Serbia, now as a kingdom (1882–1914). During this period, the style is "determined". Numbers of churches are being built, rarely other forms of construction. Examples outside the territory of the Kingdom of Serbia are rare. The third and final period is related to the time between the two world wars, when there was a sudden expansion of the style across the whole of the Kingdom of Serbs, Croats and Slovenes, later Yugoslavia, although its presence was much more dominant in the east, "Serbian" (mostly Central Serbia) part of the work of the Kingdom. Examples of the western part of the Kingdom of Yugoslavia are rare and are mainly related to specific examples of church architecture of the Serbian Orthodox Church. In addition, there are examples related to the Serbs in the diaspora, like the Church of St. Spyridon in Trieste, designed by Carlo Maciachini. Buildings in this period are equally religious and secular.

The Second World War and after was a turning point; after the war with the advent of communism, all forms of historicism in Serbian architecture are discarded, including Serbo-Byzantine style.

Architects
Prominent architects of this style are (ordered by the time in which they were active):

 Jan Nevole
Andreja Damjanović
Aleksandar Deroko
Momir Korunović
Svetozar Ivačković
Vladimir Nikolić
Jovan Ilkić
Dušan Živanović
Andra Stevanović
Branko Tanazević
Petar Popović
Jovan Novaković
Dragutin Maslać
Dragutin Inkiostri Medenjak
Vasilije Androsov
Grigorije Samojlov
Brothers Krstić

Examples

Early period (around 1850-1880)
Cathedral of Saint George in Smederevo by Andrey Damyanov
Serbian Orthodox Cathedral in Niš by Andrey Damyanov
Serbian Orthodox Cathedral in Vranje by Andrey Damyanov
Serbian Orthodox Cathedral in Sarajevo by Andrey Damyanov
Cathedral of the Holy Trinity in Mostar by Andrey Damyanov
Church of the Ascension in Belgrade by Pavle Stanišić and Jovan Ristić

Middle period (1880-1914)
Saint Spyridon Church in Trieste by Carlo Maciachini
Old church in Pančevo by Svetozar Ivačković
Church of St. Elias in Leskovac by Svetozar Ivačković
Church at the New Cemetery in Belgrade by Svetozar Ivačković
Saint Peter's Church in Jagodina by Svetozar Ivačković
The chapel at the cemetery in Sremski Karlovci by Vladimir Nikolić
Holy Trinity Church in Paraćin by Jovan Ilkić
Saint George's church in Kruševac by Dušan Živanović
Church of St. Archangel Michael in Herceg Novi
St. Sava Church in Kosovska Mitrovica by Andra Stevanović
St George's Church in Oplenac by Andra Stevanović
The building of the old telephone exchange in Belgrade by Branko Tanazević
Home of Vuk's Foundation in Belograde by Branko Tanazević
District offices in Vranje by Petar Popović

Late period (1914-1941)
Grammar school in Čačak by Dragutin Maslać
Grammar school in Sremska Mitrovica by Momir Korunović
Church of the Ascension of Christ in Krupanj by Momir Korunović
Ministry of Post in Belgrade by Momir Korunović
Sokol home in Bijeljina by Momir Korunović
Old Post Office in Belgrade by Momir Korunović
Cathedral of Christ the Saviour in Banja Luka by Dušan Živanović
Church of Saint Sava by Bogdan Nesterović and Aleksandar Deroko
White Palace in Dedinje, Belgrade by  Živojin Nikolić, Viktor Lukomski and Nikolay Krasnov
House of Elezović in Belgrade by Aleksandar Deroko
Building of the Patriarchate in Belgrade by Viktor Lukomski
St. Mark's Church in Belgrade by Branko and Petar Krstić
Church of St. Constantine and Helen in Požega by Vasilij Adrosov
Sokol home in Sombor by J. Bazler and V. Sabo
Banski Dvor in Banja Luka
The mausoleum in Corfu by Nikolay Krasnov
Đorđević's House on Topčider in Belgrade by Branislav Kojić
Hotel in Sopoćani near Novi Pazar by Dragiša Brašovan

See also
Raška architectural school
Serbo-Byzantine architecture
Morava architectural school

References

Further reading
 

Serbian architectural styles
Byzantine Revival architecture in Serbia
Serbian Orthodox Church
19th century in Serbia
20th century in Serbia
Kingdom of Serbia
Kingdom of Yugoslavia